In enzymology, a 2-amino-4-hydroxy-6-hydroxymethyldihydropteridine diphosphokinase is an enzyme that catalyzes the chemical reaction

ATP + 2-amino-4-hydroxy-6-hydroxymethyl-7,8-dihydropteridine  AMP + (2-amino-4-hydroxy-7,8-dihydropteridin-6-yl)methyl diphosphate

Thus, the two substrates of this enzyme are ATP and 2-amino-4-hydroxy-6-hydroxymethyl-7,8-dihydropteridine, whereas its two products are AMP and (2-amino-4-hydroxy-7,8-dihydropteridin-6-yl)methyl diphosphate.

This enzyme belongs to the family of transferases, specifically those transferring two phosphorus-containing groups (diphosphotransferases).  The systematic name of this enzyme class is ATP:2-amino-4-hydroxy-6-hydroxymethyl-7,8-dihydropteridine 6'-diphosphotransferase. Other names in common use include 2-amino-4-hydroxy-6-hydroxymethyldihydropteridine pyrophosphokinase, H2-pteridine-CH2OH pyrophosphokinase, 7,8-dihydroxymethylpterin-pyrophosphokinase, HPPK, 7,8-dihydro-6-hydroxymethylpterin pyrophosphokinase, and hydroxymethyldihydropteridine pyrophosphokinase.  This enzyme participates in folate biosynthesis.

This enzyme catalyses the first step in a three-step pathway leading to 7,8 dihydrofolate. Bacterial HPPK (gene folK or sulD) is a protein of 160 to 270 amino acids. In the lower eukaryote Pneumocystis carinii, HPPK is the central domain of a multifunctional folate synthesis enzyme (gene fas).

Structural studies

References

Further reading
 
 
 

Protein domains
EC 2.7.6
Enzymes of known structure